Oakridge is an unincorporated community in Montgomery County, Tennessee. It is part of the Clarksville, TN–KY Metropolitan Statistical Area.

References

External links
Google Maps

Unincorporated communities in Montgomery County, Tennessee
Unincorporated communities in Tennessee
Clarksville metropolitan area